Rock is the second recorded work by the band Casting Pearls.9

Track 3, "Wastin' Time" was re-used on their next release, Casting Pearls.

Track listing 
Stuck
Love But Dread
Wastin' Time
Off The Hook
Close Your Eyes
Need You Here
All About Love
August
2 a.m.

External links
https://web.archive.org/web/20071001001201/http://www.purevolume.com/albums/castingpearls/rock

2002 EPs
VOTA albums